Alemari is a 2012 Indian Kannada romantic action drama film starring Yogesh and Radhika Pandit in the lead roles. The story, screenplay, lyrics and direction is by Hari Santhosh. The music of the film was composed by Arjun Janya. B. K. Srinivas has produced the venture under BK Srinivasa Productions. The film released in theatres across Karnataka on 9 March 2012. However the film is rated as an average, but the director Hari Santhosh fetched best director in Karnataka state film awards 2012–13.

Cast
Yogesh as Pardeshi 
Radhika Pandit as Neeli
Rakesh Adiga
Ramesh Bhat
Umashri
Mandeep Roy
Adhi Lokesh as Palavu Chandra
Raju Talikote as Murthy 
Nayana

Reception

Critical response 

A critic from The Times of India scored the film at 4 out of 5 stars and says "Yogesh is brilliant as a loverboy and physically impaired person; Radhika is lively as the girl next door; Nayana impresses you with her bold and beautiful performance; Adi Lokesh has done justice to the role; Josh Rakesh makes a positive beginning as a villain. Music by Arjun Janya has some catchy tunes". B S Srivani from Deccan Herald wrote "But by then the whole drama is over, leaving only lingering sadness and dissatisfaction behind. With the underworld as the backdrop, director Santhu recounts the tale of a wanderer and lets him remain so, all his life. A rootless existence finds resonance in “Alemaari”". Srikanth Srinivasa from Rediff.com scored the film at 2.5 out of 5 stars and wrote "Director Santhu has missed an opportunity to give his audience a deeper understanding of the film. Although the film is watchable, it could have been handled better and the message of the wanderer be made clearer. It is not really worth wandering into the theatre to watch this movie". A critic from Bangalore Mirror wrote  "The songs are full of life and good to watch as well. The dialogues are witty in parts and repetitive in bits. If only the maker/editor had a bigger pair of scissors, Alemaari would have been a great watch. Santu, as a director, is definitely promising". Y Maheswara Reddy from DNA wrote "The music by Arjun Janya is will leave you humming a few tunes even after the movie, but Neeli Neeli, rendered by Shreya Ghoshal and Javed Ali, deserves a special mentions. Simply put, after a really long time, here’s a Kannada film, you wouldn’t mind watching".

Soundtrack

Arjun Janya composed the film's background score and music for its soundtrack, with all the lyrics written by Hari Santhosh . The soundtrack album consisting of nine tracks was distributed by Ashwini Media.

References

2012 films
2010s Kannada-language films
Films scored by Arjun Janya
Films shot in Bijapur, Karnataka
2012 directorial debut films
Films directed by Hari Santhosh